The diving competitions at the 2024 Summer Olympics in Paris are scheduled to run from 27 July to 10 August 2024 at the Paris Aquatics Centre. A total of 136 divers, with an equal distribution between men and women, will compete across eight medal events (four per gender in both individual and synchronized) at these Games, the exact same amount as Tokyo 2020.

Qualification

136 diving quota places, with an equal split between men and women, are available for Paris 2024; NOCs can enter a maximum of two divers each in the men's and women's individual events and a gender-based pair in the synchronized events, respecting a sixteen-member (eight per gender) country limit. To be eligible for the Games, all divers must be 14 years old and above on or before December 31, 2023; and must participate in various international meets approved by World Aquatics.

Individual events
The qualification spots for each of the individual springboard and platform diving events (both men and women) will be attributed as follows:
 2023 World Championships – The top twelve finalists of each individual event will obtain a quota place for their NOC at the 2023 World Aquatics Championships, scheduled for July 14 to 30, in Fukuoka, Japan.
 Continental Qualification Tournaments – The winners of each individual event will obtain a quota place for their NOC at one of the five continental meets (Africa, the Americas, Asia, Europe, and Oceania) approved by World Aquatics.
 2024 World Championships – Twelve highest-ranked divers eligible for qualification will obtain a quota place for their NOC in each individual event at the 2024 World Aquatics Championships, scheduled for February 2 to 18, in Doha, Qatar, respecting the two-member country limit and without surpassing the total quota of 136.
 Reallocation – Additional spots will be entitled to the eligible divers placed thirteenth and above in their corresponding individual events, respecting the two-member country limit, at the 2024 World Aquatics Championships until they attain the total quota of 136.
 Host nation – As the host country, France reserves four men's and four women's spots to be distributed in each of the individual diving events.

Synchronized events
Each synchronized diving event features eight teams from their respective NOCs, composed of the following:
 3: the top three (or the medal-winning) pairs at the 2023 World Aquatics Championships, scheduled for July 14 to 30, in Fukuoka, Japan
 4: the top four pairs vying for qualification at the 2024 World Aquatics Championships, scheduled for February 2 to 18,  in Doha, Qatar
 1: reserved for the host country France

Competition schedule

Medal summary

Medal table

Men's events

Women's events

See also
Diving at the 2022 Asian Games
Diving at the 2022 Commonwealth Games
Diving at the 2023 Pan American Games

References

 
2024
2024 Summer Olympics events
Diving competitions in France
International aquatics competitions hosted by France
Olympics